St.Matthias Mulumba Senior Seminary is Kenya's National Theologicum Seminary for training of Catholic clergy.  It is the youngest of four National Catholic Seminaries in Kenya and is owned and run by the Kenya Conference of Catholic Bishops K.C.C.B and the Holy See.  it was the biggest theologicum in Kenya, with over 100 students and a capacity for double the number.

It celebrated its silver Jubilee on 14 February 2014.

History
The seminary's history can be dated from around 1962, when Mill Hill priest Fr. Kuhn was asked by the bishop of Kisumu to start a parish in Tindinyo. Fr. Kuhn invited the Xaverian Brothers from Mumias to establish their house and serve Tindinyo parish. These brothers built a school, Our lady of Perpetual Help Secondary school for form I and II for their aspirants.

By around 1968-69 there were hardly any aspirants joining the school, and it was converted into a high school for forms V and VI of St. Peters Minor Seminary. During that time it was unofficially referred to as “Tindinyo College.” Among the prominent students of the then Tindinyo college are Bishop John Oballa Owaa, the ordinary of Ngong diocese and the Late Bishop Linus Okok Okwatch,   Bishop Norman King’oo Wambua of Machakos Diocese, Bishop Mark Kadima ordinary of Bungoma diocese.  This college was faced out with the introduction of the 8-4-4 system of education.

Meanwhile, the Catholic bishops of Kenya were contemplating beginning a Second Theologicum to serve as home for African Christian Theology and inculturation, and Tindinyo provided a fertile ground for such an enterprise. On 27 January 1989 the new theologicum opened its doors to 79 students, a resident staff of three priests (the founding rector was Fr. Sylvester Sulwe) and served by the Assumption Sisters of Eldoret. It was named after the oldest Uganda Martyr, St. Matthias Mulumba Kalemba. On 22 February 1989 the seminary was officially inaugurated by the Apostolic Nuncio to Kenya Archbishop Clemente Faccani accompanied by all the bishops of Kenya, including Maurice Michael Cardinal Otunga. Later the Seminary was affiliated to the Pontifical Urban University in Rome and was hence able to offer the baccalaureate degree in sacred theology in addition to its internal diploma in theology. Bishop Micheal Otieno Odiwa of Homabay diocese was a student in the pioneer class of St. Matthias Mulumba Senior Seminary, Tindinyo.

Tindinyo Seminary was temporarily closed on 16 February 2005. It was reopened on 5 August 2005 with 79 theology I students and three resident staff with the Assumption Sisters of Eldoret as supporting staff. The staff comprised Fr. Maurice Muhatia Makumba (later Bishop of Nakuru), Fr. Michael Kamau Ithondeka (Vice Rector and dean of students) and Fr. Edward Kipyegon (spiritual Director and dean of Studies). The seminary was officially inaugurated on August 7, 2005 by Nicodemus Kirima of the Archdiocese of Nyeri. Later on 4 November 2006, the apostolic nuncio to Kenya Alain Paul Lebeaupin made an apostolic visit.

The Seminary's first Rector was Fr. Sylvester Sulwe. Others include Fathers Benjamin Kiriswa, Patrick Maliti, John Philiph Odero, Boniface Kariuki, Maurice Muhatia Makumba (later Bishop of Nakuru), Dominic Kimengich (later Bishop of Lodwar), Daniel Nakameti, and, Douglas Mwinja.

Former students
Among prominent former students are:
Bishop Michael Odiwa of Homabay Diocese
Bishop Elect Cleophas Oseso of Nakuru Diocese
 Fr. Lugonzo, the immediate former secretary general of A.M.E.C.E.A.and as of January 2021 the General Secretary Kenya Conference of Catholic Bishops. 
 Fr. Micheal Kamau Ithondeka
 Fr. Paul Miyam, 
 Fr. Callistus Nyangilo, Notary of the Archdiocese of Nairobi
 Fr. Vincent Mulwa, parish priest of Our Lady of Victory Cathedral,  Machakos Diocese
 Fr. Leonard Ekisa
 Fr. Silas Ndwiga, lecturer of Canon Law at the same seminary,  
 Fr. Dunstan Epalaat, a pastoral theologian who was also a formatter in the same seminary

 Fr. Eliud Thomas Wanyoinke, Vicar General of Embu diocese

 Fr. Augustine Chumo from diocese of Rochester in New York

Lazarus Nzai Chogo of Mombasa Archdiocese

Fr. Casmir Odundo of Nakuru Diocese (summa cum laude). From The Pontifical Urban University, Class of 2016.

Fr. Benedict Nzinga of Machakos Diocese (summa cum laude) Pontifical Urban University, Class of 2018.

Oguda Edwine Amollo (Summa cum Laude) Pontifical Urban University, Class of 2022. 

Fr. Wallace Ng'ang'a, pastoral coordinator,  Archdiocese of Nairobi.

Professors
Among the professors who have taught in the Seminary are:

 Bishop Maurice Muhatia of  Roman Catholic Diocese of Nakuru
 Bishop Dominic Kimengich of Eldoret
Bishop Philip Anyolo of Homabay
Bishop Linus Okok, Emeritus of Homabay
Bishop Wilybard Lagho of Malindi
Fr Thomas Richard Heath OP
  Very Rev. Fr. Daniel Rono, Former General Secretary, K.C.C.B 
 Terry Henley, a pastoral theologian from Kitale
 Historian John Baur
 Fr. Anslem Kamuyu, (sacred scripture)
 Fr. John Njue, (Systematic Theology).
 Fr. Benedict Muchenditsi (Sacred Scripture), 
 Fr. John Lelei, Member commission for liturgy in K.C.C.B and currently Rector of St. Thomas Aquinas Seminary, Langata.
 Fr. Charles Simbe (Church history)
 Fr. Maurice Kigame 
 Fr. Josephat Ndunda (Spirituality)
 Fr. Pius Obuya (Systematic Theology)
 Fr. John Kamau (Moral Theology)
 Fr. Dr. Emmanuel Owuor (Systematic Theology)
 Fr. Erick Mwangi Gichomo
 Fr. Benjamin Njuguna
 Fr. Charles Kiruy (Sacred Scripture)
 Fr. Francis Kimanthi (Sacred Scripture)
 Fr. John Ndirangu (General Spiritual Director)
 Fr. Stephen Lumala OP
 Prof. Peter Gichure

Seminary Mayors

Many higher institutes of learning such as colleges, universities and major seminaries have an overall student leader who is normally referred to as the chairperson of the students association or as the Student Dean or simply as the head Student. However, in Tindinyo the case is different the student leader is called the MAYOR of Tindinyo and he governs with his council made up of a deputy MAYOR among other leaders. However, the term MAYOR was only incorporated in Tindinyo around 1999 when the student’s council felt the need to come up with a new title that would befit the student’s body made up of mature and responsible students. The following are the MAYORs (student leaders) who have served who have the seminary since inception (Many of who are now priests and Deacons, few deceased):
1) Mulumba Matthias (1989)
2) Michael Kamau Ithondeka (1989)
3) Muraga Henry
4) Amisi Protus (1991)
5) Francis Murira(1992)
6) Nobert Chumu (1993)
7) Martin Wanyama (1993)
8) Charles M. Kanai(1994)
9) Matheka Peter (1994)
10) Munyaka George (1995)
11) Etyang John Bosco (1995)
12) Mwangi Josephat (1996)
13) Michael Mwambegu (1997)
14) Kiplagat Pius(1997)
15) Eliud Wanyoinke (1998)
16) Waweru Benson (1998)
17) Francis Mukindi (1999)
18) Silas Ndwiga (2000)
19) Muchiri Joseph (2000)
20) Wambua Nicholas (2005)
21) Joseph Likuli Miruka (2006)
22) Okinyo Gabriel Atieno (2007)
23) Moseti Cydas (2007)
24) Mutia Daniel Muriungi (2008)
25) Nyangau Darius (2008)
26) Chege Joseph (2009-2010)
27) Silas Mawira(2009-2010)
28) Nobert Migoye(2010-2011)
29) Godias Kipkoech (2011-2012)
30) Vincent Alumasa (2013)
31) Amos Baraza(2013)
32) Elijah Namwaya (2013)
33) Denis Wangila (2014)
34) Lazarus Chogo (2015)
35) Romanus Ageng'a Omuto (2015)

References

Seminaries and theological colleges in Kenya
Catholic Church in Kenya